Chit A Mhya is a 1979 Burmese black-and-white drama film, directed by Thukha starring Zaw Lin, Khin Yu May and Cho Pyone. The film is a remake of the 1940 film of the same name.

Cast
Zaw Lin as Tin Oo
Khin Yu May as Aye Aye Thwe
Cho Pyone as Tin Tin Mar
Eant Kyaw as Ba Than Tin
Jolly Swe as Shwe Taung

Award

References

1979 films
Remakes of Burmese films
1970s Burmese-language films
Films shot in Myanmar
Burmese black-and-white films
1979 drama films
Burmese drama films